The Four Corners Gallery and film project is an arts centre dedicated to independent photography and film-making located in the East End of London at 121 Roman Road, Bethnal Green. It hosts exhibitions, film production facilities and screenings of new work. The project was founded nearby in 1973; it moved into its present purpose-built premises in 2007. Initially it survived on tiny funding; it then received money from Channel 4 during the 1980s. Its expansion has been supported by Arts Council England, the London Development Agency, the European Regional Development Fund, Film London and the London Borough of Tower Hamlets.

References

Arts centres in London
Film organisations in the United Kingdom